Otlica is a dispersed settlement in the hills north of Ajdovščina in the Littoral region of Slovenia. It is made up of smaller clusters of the hamlets of Sibirija, Kitajska, Kurja Vas, and Cerkovna, as well as a number of outlying isolated farms.

Geography
Otlica is located on the high Trnovo Forest Plateau, overlooking the Vipava Valley. The part of the larger plateau known as the Otlica Plateau is named after Otlica. Together with the ridge-top villages of Predmeja, Kovk, and Gozd, it is part of an area locally known as Gora (literally, 'the mountain').

Names
The name Otlica is derived from the Slovene adjective otel 'hollow'. In folk tradition the mountain was therefore referred to as being hollow. The hamlet of Siberija (literally, 'Siberia') is so named because of its exposure to the frost and the bora wind, and the hamlet of Kitajska (literally, 'China') is a reference to the large number of children that people living there had.

Church

The parish church in the settlement is dedicated to the Guardian Angels and belongs to the Koper Diocese.

References

External links 

Otlica at Geopedia

Populated places in the Municipality of Ajdovščina